"Fallen" is the first single from Canadian singer-songwriter Sarah McLachlan's fifth studio album, Afterglow (2003). The song was a moderate commercial success, reaching number 32 in Ireland, number 41 in Australia and the United States, and number 50 in the United Kingdom. At the 2004 Grammy Awards, it was nominated for Best Female Pop Vocal Performance, losing to "Beautiful" by Christina Aguilera.

Track listings

US CD single
 "Fallen" (radio mix) – 3:48
 "Fallen" (album mix) – 3:51
 "Answer" (acoustic live) – 3:43

Australian CD single
 "Fallen" (radio mix) – 3:48
 "Answer" – 3:43
 "Hold On" – 6:43
 "Fallen" (video) – 3:48

UK and European CD single
 "Fallen" (album mix) – 3:48
 "Dirty Little Secret" (live) – 3:42

European maxi-CD single
 "Fallen" (radio mix) – 3:48
 "Angel" – 4:30
 "Adia" – 4:05
 "Fallen" (video) – 3:48

Charts

Weekly charts

Year-end charts

Release history

In popular culture
"Fallen" was featured on the television shows Charmed in the episode "Used Karma", on Cold Case in the episode "The Promise", and on One Tree Hill in the episode "With Arms Outstretched".

References

External links
 
 
 

Sarah McLachlan songs
2003 singles
2003 songs
Arista Records singles
Nettwerk Records singles
Songs written by Sarah McLachlan